Epilobium alpestre is a species of willowherb in the family Onagraceae. It is native to Europe and Asia.

Distribution and habitat
Epilobium alpestre is present in the Central and Southern Europe (mainly in the Alps) and in Western Asia.

Description

It is a perennial herbaceous plant with a robust, erect and hollow stem. It has a short rhizome. Leaves are usually broadly lanceolate, acuminate at the apex and rounded at the base, with irregularly toothed margins, in whorls of 3 or 4. The Inflorescences are a simple, elongated. Flowers show four free acute sepals, shorter than the petals. They show a radial symmetry, 8 to 18 millimeters long and have a long tube. Corolla is pink, 1 to 1.5 cm wide, formed by four slightly indented petals and eight stamens. 

Fruits consist of a long capsule opening with 4 valves. The seeds are around 1.8 millimeters long, spindle-shaped and narrowly narrowed at the bottom. Flowering time lasts from July to September.

Bibliography
T. G. Tutin, V. H. Heywood, N. A. Burges, D. M. Moore, D. H. Valentine, S. M. Walters, D. A. Webb (Eds.): Flora Europaea. Volume 2: Rosaceae to Umbelliferae. Cambridge University Press, Cambridge 1968, p. 310

References

External links
 Tela Botanica
 Inventaire National du Patrimoine Naturel
 Flora Web

alpestre
Flora of Europe
Flora of Asia